Gujrat (Punjabi, IPA: [gʊd͡ʒ.ɾɑːt̪]) is a city in the Punjab Province of Pakistan. It is the capital of Gujrat District and it is the 21st largest city of Pakistan by population. Along with the nearby cities of Sialkot and Gujranwala, Gujrat forms part of the Golden Triangle of industrial cities with export-oriented economies.

History
The area around Gujrat was settled during the reign of the Suri ruler Sher Shah prior to the Mughals. The area was named Khwaspur, in honour of Suri's Governor of Rohtas, Khwas Khan. Local traditions state that Gujrat is the second town to be built in the area, with the first having been destroyed by Mongol invasions in 1303.

The city came under the Mughal Empire and was further developed during the reign of the Mughal Emperor Akbar the Great, who built the Gujrat Fort in 1580, and compelled local Gujjars to settle in the city in 1596–97. The city was then named in reference to the Gujjar tribes. In 1605, Syed Abdul Kasim was granted the city as a fief by Akbar.

During the reign of Emperor Jahangir, Gujrat was part of the route used by Mughal royals when visiting Kashmir.

Legend has it that the most famous saint of Gujrat, Shah Daula, is credited with having saved the city from the Sikh Guru Hargobind when the people of Gujrat made fun out of him during his stay as he was returning from Kashmir around 1620.

During the Mughal era, Gujrat was encircled by a wall with five gates, of which only the Shah Daula gate survives.

With the death of Aurangzeb in 1707, the Mughal Empire began to weaken significantly. The authority which did linger on remained in the hands of Mughal Nawabs who gave nominal allegiance to the Mughal emperor in Delhi. However, in 1739, the powerful Turko-Iranian ruler Nader Shah gave the Mughals the final blow when he launched a plundering invasion sacking their capital Delhi. During his campaign, Nadir Shah sacked Gujrat on the way which was at the time a prosperous city. Shortly afterwards around 1741, the city was captured by local Punjabi Gakhar tribesmen in the ensuing chaos from near the Rawalpindi area. The city suffered further from the eight invasions of the Durrani Afghans under their new energetic ruler Ahmad Shah Durrani between 1748 and 1767.

In 1765, the city was overrun by the Sikh Bhangi Misl under Gujjar Singh who defeated the Punjabi Ghakars under Muqqarab Khan. The Sikhs defeated an Afghan force in a battle for Gujrat on 29 April 1797. In 1798, the Bhangi leader Sahib Singh pledged allegiance to the Sukerchakia Misl of Ranjit Singh who later established the Sikh Empire in 1799. By 1810, Ranjit Singh's armies captured the city from Bhangi forces, thereby extending the rule of the Sikh Empire to the city.

Gujrat finally came under British control in 1849, following the collapse of the Sikh Empire in the wake of the Sikh defeat at the Battle of Gujrat on 22 February, which ended the Second Anglo-Sikh War. In 1867, Gujrat was constituted as a municipality.
According to the census the city had a population of 18,396 in 1881, 19,410 in 1901 and 21,974 in 1921.

Geography
Gujrat is an ancient city of Pakistan located between two famous rivers, Jhelum River and Chenab River. It is bounded to the northeast by Azad Kashmir; to the northwest by the Jhelum River; to the east and southeast by the Chenab River, separating it from the districts of Gujranwala and Sialkot; and to the west by Mandi Bahauddin District. Gujrat consists of three tehsils: Sarai Alamgir, Kharian and Gujrat.

Climate
Gujrat has a hot semi-arid climate (Köppen climate classification BSh), although it is almost wet enough to be a monsoon-influenced humid subtropical climate (Cwa).

Education

Some of the notable educational institutes of Gujrat include:
University of Gujrat
Govt. Zamindar PG College, Gujrat
Nawaz Sharif Medical College
University of Lahore
University of Central Punjab
Punjab College of Science, Gujrat Campus
The Superior College, Gujrat Campus
Pakistan International Public School, Gujrat Campus
Beaconhouse School System
The Educators
Lahore Grammar School
Dar-e-Arqam Schools

Notable persons

Chaudhry Hussain Elahi, Member of the National Assembly of Pakistan; son of Chaudhry Wajahat Hussain
 Chaudhry Pervaiz Elahi, former Deputy Prime Minister of Pakistan, former Chief Minister of Punjab, Speaker of the Provincial Assembly of Punjab, August 2018–present, previously 1997–1999; former Chairman of District Council, Gujrat; former Provincial Minister for Local Government and Rural Development
Chaudhry Zahoor Elahi, Member of the National Assembly of Pakistan in 1962 and 1970; Deputy Opposition Leader in the National Assembly of Pakistan 1972–1977; Federal Minister for Manpower, Labor, Local Government & Rural Development 1978–1979
Moonis Elahi, Federal Minister for Water Resources, Member of the National Assembly of Pakistan, twice elected as the member of the Provincial Assembly of Punjab, 2008–2013 and 2013–2018
Syed Munir Hussain Gilani, Pakistani politician
Nawabzada Ghazanfar Ali Gul, former Federal Minister of Pakistan
 Imam Din Gujrati, humorous poet of Urdu and Punjabi
Chaudhry Shujaat Hussain, former Prime Minister of Pakistan, Member Pakistan Majlis-e-Shura; re-elected five times as Member of the National Assembly of Pakistan; re-elected twice as Member of the Senate of Pakistan; former Federal Minister for Interior, Information, Industries & Production; "Honorary Consul General" of the Republic of Korea
Chaudhry Wajahat Hussain, former Federal Minister for Overseas Pakistanis; Federal Minister for Labour and Manpower and Federal Minister for Human Resource Development; three times MPA and two times MNA
Saleem Sarwar Jaura, Member of the Provincial Assembly of Punjab
Muhammad Afzal Lone, lawyer and judge
Mian Imran Masood, former MPA of Gujrat and Minister of Education Punjab
Ahmad Mukhtar, former Minister for Defence, Government of Pakistan
Shujaat Nawaz, Member of the Provincial Assembly of Punjab
Yasmin Qureshi, British MP
Muhammad Abdullah Warraich, Member of the Provincial Assembly of Punjab

References

 
Populated places in Gujrat District
Populated places in Punjab, Pakistan
Cities in Punjab (Pakistan)